Hawaiian hibiscus are seven species of hibiscus native to Hawaii. The yellow hibiscus is Hawaii's state flower. Most commonly grown as ornamental plants in the Hawaiian Islands are the non-native Chinese hibiscus (Hibiscus rosa-sinensis) and its numerous hybrids, though the native Hibiscus arnottianus is occasionally planted.

The native plants in the genus Hibiscus in Hawaii are thought to have derived from four independent colonization events for the five endemic species (four closely related species plus the yellow-flowered species) and one each for the two indigenous species.

Native species
The native hibiscus found in Hawaii are:

Hibiscus arnottianus A.Gray – kokio keokeo ("kokio that is white like the shine of silver") is an endemic species of hibiscus with white flowers. Three subspecies are recognized: H. arnottianus ssp. arnottianus found in the Waianae Range of western Oahu; H. a. ssp. immaculatus which is very rare (listed as endangered) on Molokai; and H. a. ssp. punaluuensis from the Koolau Range on Oahu. Perhaps only a dozen plants of H. a. ssp. immaculatus exist in nature in mesic and wet forests.  This species is closely related to H. waimeae, and the two are among the very few members of the genus with fragrant flowers.  It is sometimes planted as an ornamental or crossed with H. rosa-sinensis.  In the Hawaiian language, the white hibiscus is known as the pua aloalo.
 Hibiscus brackenridgei A.Gray – mao hau hele ("hau most similar to mao") is a tall shrub (up to ) with bright yellow flowers, closely related to the widespread H. divaricatus. This species is listed as an endangered species by the USFWS. The yellow flower of this species was made the official state flower of Hawaii on 6 June 1988, and although endangered in its natural habitats, has become a moderately popular ornamental in Hawaiian yards.
Hibiscus clayi O.Deg. & I.Deg. is an endemic shrub or small tree with bright red flowers, generally similar to H. kokio, and found in nature on Kauai in dry forests. It is listed as endangered by USFWS.
 Hibiscus furcellatus Desr. is a pink-flowered hibiscus considered an indigenous species, typically found in low and marshy areas of the Caribbean, Florida, Central and South America, and Hawaii, where it is known as akiohala, akiahala, hau hele, and hau hele wai ("entirely puce hau").
Hibiscus kokio Hillebr., kokio or kokio ula ("red kokio") is a shrub or small tree with red to orangish (or rarely yellow) flowers. This endemic species is not officially listed, but considered rare in nature.
 Hibiscus tiliaceus L., hau, is a spreading shrub or tree common to the tropics and subtropics, especially in coastal areas.  This species is possibly indigenous to Hawaii, but may have been introduced by the early Polynesians.
Two subspecies are recognized: H. waimeae ssp. hannerae (rare and listed as endangered) found in northwestern valleys of Kauai, and H. w. ssp. waimeae occurring in the Waimea Canyon and some western to southern valleys on Kauai. This species closely resembles H. arnottianus in a number of characteristics.

Other Malvaceae 
In addition to the species of Hibiscus listed above, flowers of several other related Hawaiian plants of the family Malvaceae resemble Hibiscus flowers, although are generally smaller. The endemic genus, Hibiscadelphus, comprises seven species described from Hawaii. Three of these are now thought to be extinct and the remaining four are listed as critically endangered or extinct in the wild. Another endemic genus, Kokia, comprises four species of trees. All but one (K. kauaiensis) are listed as either extinct or nearly extinct in the wild.

Three endemic species of the pantropical genus, Abutilon occur in Hawaii: A. eremitopetalum, A. menziesii, and A. sandwicense; all are listed as endangered. Cotton plants (Gossypium spp.), whose bright yellow flowers are certainly hibiscus-like, include one endemic: G. tomentosum, uncommon but found in dry places on all the main islands except Hawaii. The widespread milo (Thespesia populnea) is an indigenous tree with yellow and maroon flowers.

South Korea's national flower is the Hibiscus syriacus which is widely found in Hawaii, too.

References

External links

Hibiscus
Endemic flora of Hawaii
Symbols of Hawaii
Flora without expected TNC conservation status